Fadel Gobitaka (born 16 January 1998) is a professional footballer who plays for Belgian National Division 1 club RAAL La Louvière. He plays as a forward. Born in Belgium, he has represented Togo at youth international level.

Club career
Gobitaka is a youth exponent from Standard Liège. On 27 December 2015, he made his Belgian Pro League debut with Standard Liège against Royal Mouscron-Péruwelz.

In the summer 2019, he joined Dutch club Roda JC Kerkrade and was in the first place registered for the Jong-squad. However, he played two games for Roda in the Eerste Divisie. In May 2020 it was confirmed, that Gobitaka would join FC Differdange 03 from the 2020–21 season.

On 1 September 2021, Gobitaka joined RAAL La Louvière on a one-year deal. After promotion to the Belgian National Division 1 was secured, he signed a contract extension until 2023.

International career
Gobitaka was born in Belgium and is of Togolese descent. Gobitaka made his professional debut for the Togo U23s in a 5–0 friendly loss to the Ivory Coast U23s on 37 March 2018.

References

1998 births
Living people
People from Sint-Agatha-Berchem
Association football forwards
Citizens of Togo through descent
Togolese footballers
Togo youth international footballers
Belgian footballers
Belgian people of Togolese descent
Belgian sportspeople of African descent
Black Belgian sportspeople
Standard Liège players
AS Verbroedering Geel players
Roda JC Kerkrade players
FC Differdange 03 players
RAAL La Louvière players
Eerste Divisie players
Luxembourg National Division players
Belgian Pro League players
Belgian National Division 1 players
Belgian expatriate sportspeople in the Netherlands
Belgian expatriate sportspeople in Luxembourg
Togolese expatriate sportspeople in the Netherlands
Togolese expatriate sportspeople in Luxembourg
Expatriate footballers in the Netherlands
Expatriate footballers in Luxembourg
Footballers from Brussels